Silverstone is a village and civil parish in Northamptonshire, England. The population of the civil parish at the 2011 census was 2,176. The A43 now bypasses to the south-east of the village.

The village's name probably means, 'farm/settlement of Saewulf/Sigewulf'.

The Silverstone Circuit, the current home of the British Grand Prix, is located nearby; it straddles the Northamptonshire and Buckinghamshire border.

The village is listed in the Domesday Book of 1086 as Silvestone and Selvestone.

Parish church

Silverstone had a chapel by AD 1200. In about 1780 the medieval building was replaced by a Georgian one, which was enlarged by the addition of a chancel in 1841 and a north aisle and vestry in 1852. The entire church was demolished in the 1880s and replaced by the present Church of England parish church of Saint Michael, which is a Gothic Revival building designed by James Piers St Aubyn and completed in 1884.

On the north side of the parish churchyard are the remains of medieval fish ponds.

Facilities
The village has one public house: the White Horse Inn.

Silverstone University Technical College opened at the circuit in September 2013.

Adjacent to Silverstone Circuit is Silverstone Park, a business park operated by MEPC plc, with a focus on engineering and high-tech activities. The site is home to over 80 organisations, including Envision Virgin Racing, David Brown Automotive, Delta Motorsport, Ducati UK Ltd, National College for Motorsport, Danecca Limited and Hexagon Manufacturing Intelligence. It also features the UK's only dedicated sub-contract inspection metrology facility, managed by Hexagon Manufacturing Intelligence, a technical partner to Red Bull Formula 1.  

Silverstone is also the base of the Formula One constructor Aston Martin, which was formerly known as Racing Point, Force India, and Jordan Grand Prix.

In the Middle Ages, the village trade was primarily in timber from the surrounding Whittlewood forest through the use of coppicing. Linnell Brothers still operate a woodyard to this day.

References

Further reading

External links

Villages in Northamptonshire
Civil parishes in Northamptonshire
West Northamptonshire District